The Galway Junior Football Championship is an annual Gaelic football competition contested by lower-tier Galway GAA clubs.
The winners of the Galway Championship qualify to represent their county in the Connacht Junior Club Football Championship.
The winners also receive promotion to compete in the following year's intermediate grade.

Despite the competition's name, senior clubs may also play in this competition: for example, in 2018 Corofin won it.

Qualification for subsequent competitions

Connacht Junior Club Football Championship
The Galway JFC winners qualify for the Connacht Junior Club Football Championship. It is the only team from County Galway to qualify for this competition. The Galway JFC winners enter the Connacht Junior Club Football Championship at the quarter-final stage. For example, 2018 runner-up Clonbur (who were defeated by senior club Corofin in the 2018 final) played in the Connacht JFC final.

All-Ireland Junior Club Football Championship
The Galway JFC winners — by winning the Connacht Junior Club Football Championship — may qualify for the All-Ireland Junior Club Football Championship, at which they would enter at the semi-final stage, providing they haven't been drawn to face the British champions in the quarter-finals.

Roll of honour

References

External links
Official Galway Website
Galway on Hoganstand
Galway Club GAA

Gaelic football competitions in County Galway
Galway GAA club championships
Junior Gaelic football county championships